Greensleeves Rhythm Album #30: Bollywood is an album in Greensleeves Records' rhythm album series.  It was released in October 2002 on CD and LP.  The album features various artists recorded over the "Bollywood" riddim. The riddim was produced by Byron Murray and Clifford Smith for the In The Streetz label.  The riddim is an interpolation of the DJ Quik-produced record Addictive by singer Truth Hurts and samples the song "Thoda Resham Lagta Hai" by Indian singer Lata Mangeshkar.

Track listing
"Lock Up" - Capleton
"Heat Is On" - Sizzla
"Girls, Girls" - Lexxus
"Dig Up" - Harry Toddler
"Addiction" - Tanya Stephens
"Red Red" - Beenie Man & Robyn
"Hot For Real" - Danny English & Egg Nog
"Diggin Me" - Keri
"War" - Mr. Vegas
"In The Streez Mega Mix" - Elephant Man
"Drunken Master" - Future Troubles
"More Fire" - Determine
"Roll Up" - Ward 21
"More Marijuana" - Frisco Kid
"Street Thugz" - Alozade
"Buss A Shot" - Captain Barkey
"Cocky She Want" - Mr. Vegas
"Bounce Yuh Girl" - Mr. G
"Come Out A Mi Place" - Wickerman
"Good O" - Galaxy P

2002 compilation albums
Reggae compilation albums
Greensleeves Records albums